Nine ships of the Royal Navy have been named HMS Magpie, after the bird, the magpie:

 The first  was a 4-gun schooner launched in 1806 and captured by the French in 1807.
 The second  was launched at Jamaica in 1826 as the name vessel of her class. She was lost off Cuba two months after her launch.
 The third  was a 4-gun cutter launched in 1830, used for dockyard service after 1845, being renamed YC6. She was in service until at least 1880, and was possibly sold in 1908.
 The fourth  was a  screw gunboat launched in 1855 and wrecked in 1864.
 The fifth  was a  screw gunboat launched in 1868, used as a survey vessel after 1878, and sold in 1885.
 The sixth  was a  screw gunboat launched in 1889. She was used as a boom defence vessel from 1902, reverting to a gunboat in 1915, before being transferred for use as a depot ship later that year. She was sold in 1921.
 The seventh , later F82, was a Modified Black Swan-class sloop launched in 1943 and broken up after 1959.
 The eighth  was the trawler Hondo purchased in 1982 and used until 1996 for target practice.
 The ninth  is an inshore survey vessel, commissioned on 28 June 2018.

Battle honours
 Baltic 1855
 Benin 1897
 Atlantic 1943–1944
 Normandy 1944
 Arctic 1944

Royal Navy ship names